Diplotaxis hirta is a species of flowering plants of the family Brassicaceae. The species is endemic to Cape Verde. It is listed as an endangered plant by the IUCN.

Distribution and ecology
Diplotaxis hirta is restricted to mountain areas of the island of Fogo, between 800 and 2,000 metres elevation.

References

hirta
Endemic flora of Cape Verde
Flora of Fogo, Cape Verde
Taxa named by Auguste Chevalier